Maika Ceres is a Uruguayan/German classically trained lirico-spinto soprano singer and songwriter. She currently resides in South Lower Saxony, Germany with her husband and children.

Early life and formation 
Maika Ceres was born in the city of Montevideo, Uruguay. 
She is of Portuguese, Italian and Spanish ancestry. 
At the age of six she started playing piano and took classical piano lessons for ten years as well as singing lessons. In the year 2000 she received her Diploma for vocal technique and began her classical vocal training at age 17, specializing in Lied music.
She also played the Native American flute (Lakota) and the Galician traditional tambourine (pandeireta galega) in several concerts.

In her shows she has sung in Italian, Portuguese, Galician, English, German, Latin and Czech as well as in her mother tongue Spanish.

Ceres is also an avid traditional archer and uses a longbow for practices and competitions.

2005–2012: Music career 
She has sung in the most important venues of Uruguay such as:

Teatro Solís
Gran Teatro Plaza
Sala Zitarrosa
Castillo de Piria
Maroñas (Gran Premio Ramirez) LIVE TV
Planetario Municipal
Radisson Victoria Plaza LIVE TV 
Teatro de la Casa de la Cultura de Maldonado
She has also offered many recitals for UNICEF and various musical tributes.

Since the year 2008 she worked with Emil Montgomery, a producer / composer of experimental electronic music. With him she offered her first massive concert: Astrodomus, at Piria's Castle, on February 27, 2009, before over 20,000 people.

She was part of "The path of the Sun, a country in concert" a national tour that promoted the cultural and historical heritage of Uruguay through shows in different parts of the country.

She has been by the side of Montgomery as his lead singer in Imaginaria, playing great classics of music and FaroSur, an international festival featuring prominent national and international artists to promote peace and respect for the environment. Sharing the stage with musicians such as Kitaro and Suzanne Ciani.

Maika has participated in both collective and individual concerts in the Traditional Folk music scene in Uruguay on several Uruguayan Celtic music Festivals.

Her unique voice and musical style made possible the fact that over the years she was able to merge both Celtic and Anglo-Folk together with a classical singing style, resulting in a unique and exceptional sound of her song versions.

2013–2015 
Ceres recorded as a guest vocalist for a metal album in Germany. in Helion Studios.

In Uruguay, October 2013 she finished the voice recordings for the album of the alternative/industrial rock band VATIKA, produced by Graffiti Award winner Daniel Anselmi.
The band launched the first single "Playing" on July 1, via Facebook.

In 2014 she offered a concert in the Stadttheater Redoute in Passau, an event organised by the Volkshochschule of Passau.

In 2015 she was part of the first Kultur Jam Festival, a Concert for refugees in the city of Passau, Germany.

She continues with her classical concerts, singing mostly Classical and Baroque repertoire in Germany.

Discography
 Vatika (2014)
 Lúa Celta (2011)

DVDs
 Astrodomus
 Farosur
 Imaginaria

Guest appearances
 Vermiforme – 3103 (2014)
 Crystal Gates – "Song of the Lonely Mountain – The Hobbit OST Metal Version" (2015)

References

External links

 
 Maika Ceres on Facebook
 Maika Ceres on YouTube

Living people
Women heavy metal singers
Alternative metal musicians
Tambourine players
Women composers
Singers from Montevideo
21st-century Uruguayan women singers
Uruguayan operatic sopranos
Uruguayan women artists
Uruguayan people of Spanish descent
Uruguayan people of Italian descent
Uruguayan people of Portuguese descent
Uruguayan singer-songwriters
Year of birth missing (living people)